Vector-H (Vector Heavy) was a planned two-stage or three-stage orbital expendable launch vehicle in development by the American aerospace company Vector Launch to cover the commercial small satellite launch segment (CubeSats). It was planned to be an expanded version of the Vector-R rocket, more than doubling the payload capacity. After Vector Launch ceased operations in December 2019, the future development of the rocket is unofficially canceled.

Design

Vector-H would have used two stages, both 1.2 m in diameter, filled with Propylene/LOX propellant. The main body of the rocket was planned to be constructed using a lightweight carbon composite material.

The launch vehicle's first stage would have been powered by six LP-1 LOX/propylene engines, delivering 81,000 newtons of force. The second stage would have been powered by one LP-3 LOX/propylene engine, delivering 4,400 newtons of force. The engines used a 3D-printed engine injector, designed with help from NASA's Science, Technology and Mission Directorate (STMD) Flight Opportunities program. This allows the injector to be produced as a single piece of hardware, instead of as individual components. The vehicle was also planned to include an optional third stage powered by a solid rocket motor. This would have allowed the upper stage to boost micro satellites into a higher orbit.

Vector-HE1 
The Vector-HE1 planned variant was to have the same body as the standard Vector-H but include an electric powered third stage.

Intended usage
Vector-H was designed to launch a  payload to a  Sun-synchronous orbit, suitable for CubeSats and other small payloads. Customers could have choose to encapsulate their spacecraft in payload fairings provided by the company, which could be easily attached to the rocket shortly before launch, in several different configurations, such as fitting CubeSats dispensers or multiple satellites in a single fairing.

Vector would have used on-site payload integration for the early launches. However it expected to be able to integrate payloads at their Arizona and California Payload Facilities and ship them to their launch sites.

Launch sites

Vector Space planned to use the LC-46 launch site in Florida, Spaceport Camden, and Pacific Spaceport Complex. Additionally Vector Space investigated adding more minimal infrastructure launch pads either located on land in the US, or to launch the rocket from barges on the ocean.

See also
 Small-lift launch vehicle

References

Microsatellite launch vehicles